Jeremy Grable (born June 20, 1991) is an American football linebacker. He has also been a member of the Tampa Bay Buccaneers (NFL).

Professional career

Tampa Bay Buccaneers 
After going undrafted in the 2014 NFL Draft Grable was signed by the Tampa Bay Buccaneers on July 22, 2014. He was released by the Buccaneers on August 5, 2014. On November 14, 2014, Grable was placed on the practice squad injured reserve.

Winnipeg Blue Bombers 
Grable signed with the Winnipeg Blue Bombers (CFL) on April 18, 2017.

References

External links
Tampa Bay Buccaneers bio

1991 births
Living people
American football linebackers
Tampa Bay Buccaneers players
Players of American football from Georgia (U.S. state)
Valdosta State Blazers football players
Sportspeople from Fulton County, Georgia
African-American players of American football
21st-century African-American sportspeople